Biology Open (BiO) is an online-only peer-reviewed Open Access scientific journal published by The Company of Biologists. It was launched in 2011 and publishes research across the breadth of the biological and biomedical sciences. Biology Open is partnered with Publons, is part of the Review Commons initiative and has two-way integration with bioRxiv.

Content 
Biology Open publishes Research articles, Methods & Techniques papers, Meeting Reviews and Future Leader Reviews. 

The journal operates on a continuous publication model. The final version of record is immediately released online as soon as it is ready. 

All papers are published as Open Access articles under the CC-BY licence.

Abstracting and indexing 
Biology Open is abstracted and/or indexed by:

 Biological Abstracts
 CAB Abstracts
 Chemical Abstracts
 Thomson ISI
 PubMed Central 
PubMed
 Scopus 

It is a member of OASPA (Open Access Scholarly Publishers Association) and is indexed in the DOAJ (Directory of Open Access Journals).

Biology Open is a signatory of the San Francisco Declaration on Research Assessment (DORA).

Management 
The founding editor-in-chief was Jordan Raff, from 2011-2018.

Steven Kelly has been the Editor-in-Chief since 2018.

References

External links 
 
 The Company of Biologists website

Monthly journals
The Company of Biologists academic journals